The first season of The O.C. commenced airing in the United States on August 5, 2003, concluded on May 5, 2004, and consisted of 27 episodes. It tells the story of "the Cohen and Cooper families, and Ryan [Atwood], a troubled teen from the wrong side of the tracks" who is thrust into the wealthy, harbor-front community of Newport Beach, Orange County, California and "will forever change the lives of the residents".

The first seven episodes of The O.C. aired in the US on Tuesdays at 9:00 p.m. on FOX, a terrestrial television network. Following a seven-week mid-season hiatus, the remainder of the season aired on Wednesdays at 9:00 pm. The season was released on DVD as a seven disc boxed set under the title of The O.C.: The Complete First Season on September 26, 2004, by Warner Bros. Home Video. On June 17, 2008, the season became available to purchase for registered users of the US iTunes Store.

In the United Kingdom the season premiere aired at 9:00 pm. Sunday March 7, 2004 on Channel 4 with the second episode airing immediately after, on sister station E4. After taking a hiatus over summer, the show returned in early September to a 1:00 p.m. slot as part of T4. In Canada it aired on CTV Television Network and in Australia it was first broadcast on Nine Network, but dropped it after three episodes. Network Ten subsequently picked up the show, airing it in its entirety.

Synopsis 
It tells the story of "the Cohen and Cooper families, and high school Sophomore Ryan Atwood, a troubled teen from the wrong side of the tracks" who is thrust into the wealthy, harbor-front community of Newport Beach, Orange County, California and "will forever change the lives of the residents".

Cast and characters

Regular
 Peter Gallagher as Sandy Cohen (27 episodes)
 Kelly Rowan as Kirsten Cohen (27 episodes)
 Benjamin McKenzie as Ryan Atwood (27 episodes)
 Mischa Barton as Marissa Cooper (27 episodes)
 Adam Brody as Seth Cohen (27 episodes)
 Chris Carmack as Luke Ward (20 episodes)
 Tate Donovan as Jimmy Cooper (24 episodes)
 Melinda Clarke as Julie Cooper (episode 14 onwards; recurring ep. 1–13) (23 episodes)
 Rachel Bilson as Summer Roberts (episode 14 onwards; recurring ep. 1–13) (27 episodes)

Recurring
 Alan Dale as Caleb Nichol (14 episodes)
 Samaire Armstrong as Anna Stern (13 episodes)
 Amanda Righetti as Hailey Nichol (10 episodes)
 Navi Rawat as Theresa Diaz (8 episodes)
 Ashley Hartman as Holly Ficher (6 episodes)
 Taylor Handley as Oliver Trask (6 episodes)
 Shailene Woodley as Kaitlin Cooper (6 episodes)
 Bonnie Somerville as Rachel Hoffman (5 episodes)
 Kim Oja as Taryn Baker (4 episodes)
 Rosalind Chao as Dr Kim (3 episodes)

Episodes

Crew
The season was produced by Warner Bros. Television, Hypnotic (now Dutch Oven) and Wonderland. The executive producers were creator Josh Schwartz, Doug Liman, Dave Bartis and McG, with showrunner Bob DeLaurentis joining them after the pilot episode. Melissa Rosenberg and Allan Heinberg served as co-executive producers. Stephanie Savage was supervising producer and Loucas George producer. The staff writers were Schwartz, Savage, Heinberg, Rosenberg, Jane Espenson, Debra J. Fisher, Erica Messer, Brian Oh, J.J. Philbin and Liz Friedman. The regular directors throughout the season were Liman, Sanford Bookstaver, Michael Lange, Patrick Norris, Michael Fresco, James Marshall and Sandy Smolan.

Casting

The initial season had nine major roles receive star billing. Ben McKenzie portrayed protagonist Ryan Atwood, a troubled teenager who is thrust into the wealthy lifestyle of Newport. Mischa Barton played the girl next door, Marissa Cooper, with Tate Donovan starring as her financially troubled father Jimmy. Adam Brody acted as geeky ostracized teenager Seth Cohen with Kelly Rowan playing his mother Kirsten, the powerful businesswoman, and Peter Gallagher portraying his father, Sandy, a public defense attorney. Chris Carmack portrayed Marissa's boyfriend Luke Ward. Originally only guest stars, Melinda Clarke starred as Marissa's mother, Julie Cooper, and Rachel Bilson played Summer Roberts, best friend to Marissa and Seth's object of affection. Both gained contracts to the main cast list after thirteen episodes.

Numerous supporting characters were given expansive and recurring appearances in the progressive storyline, including Samaire Armstrong as Anna Stern, Alan Dale as wealthy businessman and father of Kirstin, Caleb Nichol. Taylor Handley played Oliver Trask, a psychotic character who viewers loved to hate. Amanda Righetti starred as Kirstin's younger sister Hailey Nichol. Navi Rawat played Theresa Diaz, childhood sweetheart of Ryan. Bonnie Somerville acted as Rachel Hoffman, a former colleague of Sandy, and Ashley Hartman portrayed Holly Fischer a friend of Marissa and Summer.

Other guest stars in recurring roles include Linda Lavin as Nana Cohen, Daphne Ashbrook as Ryan's mother Dawn and Michael Nouri as Summer's father Neil. Actors Bradley Stryker, as Ryan's brother Trey, and Shailene Woodley, as Marissa's younger sister Kaitlin, were both only guest stars at this point. However, both these characters, portrayed by different actors, would return to a larger role in later seasons.

Reception
The pilot episode of the season gained 7.5 million viewers and was nominated for a Writers Guild of America Award for best episodic drama. As the season progressed, ratings picked up with 8 million viewers tuning into for the third episode and 8.6 million viewers watching the fourth installment. This resulted in FOX initially ordering an additional six episodes. The season was split into two parts, the first consisting of seven episodes shown weekly, which averaged 8.43 million viewers. This was followed by a seven-week hiatus, in which FOX announced it had ordered another five episodes, bringing the total season to twenty-seven.

The time-slot for the second half of the season was originally planned for Thursday nights, but facing competition from CSI: Crime Scene Investigation on CBS and Will & Grace on NBC it was moved to Wednesday nights at 9:00 p.m. instead. Overall season one was the highest-rated new drama of the season among adults aged 18 to 34, averaging a total of 9.7 million viewers. The show picked up four Teen Choice Awards and was nominated for another two, as well as getting nominated for the Outstanding New Program TCA Award. In the UK, its two showings a week averaged 1.2 million viewers, and it was one of the highest rating Sunday daytime programs, also attracting fans to E4 on Monday nights. It was also well received in Australia, picking up a Logie Award for Most Popular Overseas Program in 2005.

The review aggregator website Rotten Tomatoes reported a 77% approval rating with an average rating of 6.56/10 based on 22 reviews. The website's critical consensus reads, "Even though it lacks an original take on teen angst, The O.C. functions well enough for its target audience, churning plenty of soap storylines out of a talented cast." Metacritic, which uses a weighted average, assigned a score of 67 out of 100 based on reviews from 17 critics, indicating "generally favorable reviews". However, the show did come in for some criticism. San Jose Mercury News criticized the plot and the casting saying that "the storylines usually involve the obligatory three-episode-arc drug problems or lost virginity with dialogue designed to keep a dog up to speed", and that "Whoever at FOX thought Benjamin McKenzie (Ryan on "The O.C.") could pass for anything younger than 25 should be fired". A DVD review was critical of the repetitive plot stating that "the Ryan-Marissa fol-de-rol gets tiresome as it devolves into relentless bad timing", while Entertainment Weekly did not think the acting was always up to scratch, stating "it's unfortunate to have all this potential for arm-flinging drama invested in Barton, an actress who can be as flat as a paper doll". It was also denounced for excessive brawling and glamorizing underage drinking.

DVD release
The DVD release of season one was released by Warner Bros. in the US on October 26, 2004, after it had completed broadcast on television. As well as every episode from the season, the DVD release features bonus material including a preview of the second season, deleted scenes, audio commentary and behind-the-scenes featurettes.

References

External links
 Episode guide at Warner Bros.' The OC Insider
 

Season 1
2003 American television seasons
2004 American television seasons